Dance criticism in the United States is the act of producing a written or spoken review of a dance performance (often ballet, modern dance, or contemporary dance). It may also refer to the report itself, which may act as an archived review, critique, or highlight. As with other topics, dance criticism may employ its own technical language, and may also reflect the critic's opinions. Major newspapers cover the arts in some form and dance criticism may be included. Dance criticism is available in other types of media as well, such as online publishing, through blogs, websites, and online videos.

Current dance critics

Throughout the 20th century, dance critiques were available primarily through newspaper and magazine writing. With the improvement of technology, they have become increasingly available through social media platforms and blogs, significantly influencing how the general public views dance art forms.  
Joan Acocella of The New Yorker
Jack Anderson (dance critic), formerly of The New York Times
George Dorris, former editor of the Dance Chronicle
Robert Gottlieb of The New York Observer
Laura Jacobs of The New Criterion
Deborah Jowitt, formerly of The Village Voice
Alastair Macaulay of The New York Times
John Rockwell, formerly of The New York Times
Michael Seaver of The Irish Times
Judith Mackrell of The Guardian
Luke Jennings of The Observer

History of dance criticism

Richard Buckle
Selma Jeanne Cohen
Edwin Denby
Arnold Haskell
John Martin

References

Further reading
 Robert Gottlieb (2008), Reading Dance, A gathering of memoirs, reportage, criticism, profiles, interviews, and some uncategorizable extras, Pantheon,

External links
Write About Dance
How to Write A Dance Review

Art criticism